Dimech is a Maltese surname. It may refer to:

Francis Zammit Dimech (born 1954), Maltese politician, member of the House of Representatives
Jeanette Dimech, British-born Spanish singer, known by the mononym Jeanette
Luke Dimech (born 1977), Maltese footballer
Manwel Dimech (1860–1921), Maltese social reformer in pre-independence Malta, a philosopher, a journalist, and a writer
Vincenzo Dimech (1768–1831), Maltese sculptor

See also
Manwel Dimech Bridge, a beam bridge at San Ġiljan, Malta